UiTMSAT-1 was a Malaysian nanosatellite, built primarily by Universiti Teknologi MARA (UiTM) as part of the multi-nation Birds-2 project. The 1U CubeSat was launched into space on 29 June 2018 and deployed from the International Space Station (ISS) on 10 August 2018.

Background 
Malaysia has had several satellites in orbit, beginning with the MEASAT constellation, first operational in 1996. Their first microsatellite, TiungSAT-1, was launched in 2000.

Development 
Planning for the mission began in December 2016 at the Kyushu Institute of Technology (KIT). UiTM postgraduate students Syazana Basyirah Mohammad Zaki and Muhammad Hasif Azami developed the satellite over a 19-month period and collaborated with eight other students from the Philippines, Bhutan, and Japan. This collaboration also inspired the creation of a new Communication Satellite Centre at Universiti Teknologi MARA (UiTM).

Objectives 
 Demonstrate an Automatic Packet Reporting System digipeater to communicate with amateur radio stations.
 Detect a specific type of solar radiation called "single event latch-up".
 Measure magnetic fields through the use of an Anisotropic Magneto Resistance Magnetometer.
 Act as an Earth Imaging Camera.

Launch and mission 

UiTMSAT-1 was launched to space on 29 June 2018 by the Falcon 9 Full Thrust rocket at Cape Canaveral in Florida, United States as part of the SpaceX CRS-15 Commercial Resupply Service mission. Maya-1 and BHUTAN-1, which were also developed under the Birds-2 project, were among the payload of the rocket. All three nanosatellites were deployed from the International Space Station (ISS) and achieved orbit on 10 August 2018.

References 

Spacecraft launched in 2018
CubeSats
Satellites of Malaysia
2018 in Malaysia
Satellites deployed from the International Space Station
Universiti Teknologi MARA